Jēkabs is a Latvian masculine given name; it translates in English Jacob and  James and may refer to:

Jēkabs Alksnis (1897–1938), Latvian Soviet commander of Red Army Air Forces from 1931–1937
Jēkabs Bīne (1895-1955), Latvian painter, stained glass artist, teacher and art critic
Jēkabs Bukse (1879–1942), Latvian cyclist and Olympic competitor
Jēkabs Kazaks (1895–1920), Latvian modernist painter
Jēkabs Nākums (born 1972), Latvian biathlete
Jēkabs Peterss (1886–1938), Latvian Soviet communist revolutionary, Soviet politician and chekist
Jēkabs Rēdlihs (born 1982), Latvian ice hockey player 

Latvian masculine given names